Jean Lorougnon Guédé University (in French Université Jean-Lorougnon-Guédé) is an Ivorian public university located in Daloa, in the west central region of Côte d'Ivoire. Jean Lorougnon Guédé is member of several organizations of higher education, in particular the French-speaking University Agency (AUF) and the Telecoms research and education network of Côte d'Ivoire.

History

Originally the school was a detachment of the University of Abobo-Adjamé. It has been a full-function university since 1996.

References

Universities in Ivory Coast
Buildings and structures in Sassandra-Marahoué District
Daloa